Sarah Potter (born 11 July 1961) is a former cricketer who played as a left-arm bowler and a middle-order batter. She played seven Test matches and eight One-Day Internationals for England between 1984 and 1987. She scored one Test century, an innings of 102 against India at Worcester in 1986. She played domestic cricket for West of England.

She is the daughter of the dramatist Dennis Potter. She was her father's secretary, and head of the Whistling Gypsy production company for TV dramas, most of which were written by her father. She wrote a novelization of his TV play Brimstone and Treacle, published by Quartet Books in 1982. She has also written on women's cricket for The Times. She was in a long-term relationship with sports journalist Alan Lee, who died in 2015.

References

External links
 

1961 births
Living people
England women Test cricketers
England women One Day International cricketers
West women cricketers